Edgardo Parizzia (24 November 1935 – 6 March 2010) was an Argentine former basketball player.

References

1935 births
2010 deaths
Argentine men's basketball players
1959 FIBA World Championship players
Basketball players at the 1955 Pan American Games
Pan American Games medalists in basketball
Pan American Games silver medalists for Argentina
Medalists at the 1955 Pan American Games